SMK St Mary Papar also known as Sekolah Menengah Kebangsaan St Mary Papar (SMKSMP) in Malay, is a Malaysian secondary school in East Malaysia established in 1965.

Principals

References

Secondary schools in Malaysia
Schools in Sabah